Erik Emslie (born 17 June 1965) is a South African former cricketer. He played in two first-class and four List A matches for Border from 1989–90 to 1991–92.

See also
 List of Border representative cricketers

References

External links
 

1965 births
Living people
South African cricketers
Border cricketers
People from Makhanda, Eastern Cape
Cricketers from the Eastern Cape